Oricola cellulosilytica is a Gram-negative, strictly aerobic, non-spore-forming, cellulose-degrading and motile bacterium from the genus of Oricola which has been isolated from water from the Hualien River on Taiwan.

References

Phyllobacteriaceae
Bacteria described in 2015